Dr. Jan Jerzy Buzek (27 March 1874 – 24 November 1940) was a Polish physician, activist and politician from the region of Zaolzie, Czechoslovakia.

Buzek was born in Końska as a son of a peasant. He graduated from primary school there, and later from the German gymnasium (high school) in Cieszyn. He later decided to study medicine at Jagiellonian University in Kraków and graduated in 1901. In 1902 he became a municipal and miners' doctor in the coal mining village of Doubrava. He worked in Orlová, where he helped to found the Juliusz Słowacki Polish Grammar School. In World War I he served in the Austrian Army as a doctor.

Buzek also lectured at various schools. From a young age he was active in Polish cultural and educational organizations, eventually becoming chairman of many of them, including Związek Harcerstwa Polskiego (The Polish Scouting and Guiding Association) in Czechoslovakia. He was a co-founder of the Polish People's Party, a Polish political party in Czechoslovakia of a Protestant and liberal character. In 1931 Buzek became a leader of this party. He was a member of the National Assembly of Czechoslovakia in Prague from 1929 to 1935. As a deputy, Buzek defended the rights of the Polish minority, often cooperating with another Polish deputy, socialist Emanuel Chobot.

After the outbreak of World War II, Buzek was arrested by Nazi authorities on 12 April 1940 and on 28 April incarcerated by the Nazis in the Dachau concentration camp. He was transferred on 5 June to Mauthausen-Gusen camp, and on 15 August again to Dachau concentration camp. Before arrest his weight was 118 kg, before his death 45–50 kg. He died in Dachau on 24 November 1940 from exhaustion. Before death he said to his fellow inmate:

He wished his ashes to be laid at a cemetery in Bystrzyca nad Olzą, in the grave of his first wife Anna, his first love. He is buried there.

His second wife was Jadwiga Dyboska, the daughter of Antoni Dyboski.

Footnotes

References 
 

 

 

 

1874 births
1940 deaths
People from Třinec
People from Austrian Silesia
Polish people from Zaolzie
Polish Lutherans
Polish People's Party (Czechoslovakia) politicians
Members of the Chamber of Deputies of Czechoslovakia (1929–1935)
Polish general practitioners
Jagiellonian University alumni
Politicians who died in Nazi concentration camps
Czechoslovak civilians killed in World War II
Polish civilians killed in World War II
Polish people who died in Dachau concentration camp